Fitness Blender is an American digital fitness content publisher founded by personal trainers Kelli and Daniel Segars. The company offers free and paid at-home exercise videos through their website and YouTube channel. In 2017, it was the most-watched fitness channel on YouTube.

History 
Fitness Blender was founded in 2009 as a YouTube channel by personal trainers and fitness instructors Daniel and Kelli Segars with the goal to create a minimalistic alternative to other online fitness brands.

Products 
Fitness Blender offers individual workouts and workout plans. Workout formats include high intensity interval training (HIIT), bodyweight workouts, strength training routines, and other offerings. The company offers free content as well as additional content through a paid membership program called FB Plus.

References

External links
 

Health and fitness YouTubers
2009 establishments in the United States
Internet culture